Beautiful Michoacán (Spanish: ¡Qué lindo es Michoacán!) is a 1943 Mexican musical comedy film directed by Ismael Rodríguez and starring Tito Guízar, Gloria Marín and Víctor Manuel Mendoza. A wealthy woman travels to Michoacán where she has inherited an estate.

The film's sets were designed by the art director Ramón Rodríguez Granada.

Cast

 Tito Guízar as Ernesto  
 Gloria Marín as Gloria Santibáñez  
 Víctor Manuel Mendoza as Roque  
 Evita Muñoz ("Chachita") as Chachita  
 Dolores Camarillo as Nacha  
 Jesús Graña as Evaristo 
 Manuel Noriega as Padre Francisco  
 Arturo Soto Rangel as Licenciado  
 Carolina Barret as Julia  
 Julio Ahuet as Valentín  
 Ángel Garasa as Gastón 
 Lupe del Castillo as Pianista 
 Emma Duval as Nana

References

Bibliography 
 Ruth Hellier-Tinoco. Embodying Mexico: Tourism, Nationalism & Performance. Oxford University Press, 2011.

External links 
 

1943 films
1943 musical comedy films
Mexican musical comedy films
1940s Spanish-language films
Films directed by Ismael Rodríguez
Mexican black-and-white films
1940s Mexican films